The World Archery Federation (WA, also and formerly known as FITA from the French Fédération Internationale de Tir à l'Arc) is the governing body of the sport of archery. It is based in Lausanne, Switzerland. It is composed of 156 national federations and other archery associations, and is recognised by the International Olympic Committee.

History
FITA was founded on 4 September 1931 in Lwow, Poland (today Lviv, Ukraine). Its seven founding member states were France, Czechoslovakia, Sweden, Poland, the United States, Hungary, and Italy. The aim of the organization was to create regular archery championships, and to return archery to the Olympic Games (the sport had not been featured since 1920). FITA was finally successful in returning archery to the Olympic program in the 1972 Summer Olympics.

To celebrate the organization's 80th anniversary in July 2011, a large majority of the FITA Congress voted to change the name from FITA to the World Archery Federation or WA.

In March 2022, in the wake of the 2022 Russian invasion of Ukraine, the Federation announced that no athlete, team official, or technical official from Russia or Belarus will be permitted to participate in any international archery event, their flags and anthems are banned, and no archery events would be held in the two countries.

Identity

Flag 

The WA flag has a white background, with the organization's logo in the middle.

Member associations

As of April 2019, 159 national federations and other associations are members of World Archery.

 Albania
 Algeria
 Andorra
 Argentina
 Armenia
 American Samoa
 Australia
 Austria
 Azerbaijan
 Bahamas
 Bangladesh
 Barbados
 Belgium
 Benin
 Bermuda
 Belarus
 Bhutan
 Bosnia-Herzegovina
 Brazil
 British Virgin Islands
 Bulgaria
 Cameroon
 Central African Republic
 Cambodia
 Canada
 Chad
 Chile
 China
 Colombia
 Comoros
 Costa Rica
 Cote d'Ivoire
 Croatia
 Cuba
 Cyprus
 Czech Republic
 DR Congo
 Denmark
 Dominica
 Dominican Republic
 Ecuador
 Egypt
 El Salvador
 Eritrea
 Estonia
 Falkland Islands
 Faroe Islands
 Fiji
 Finland
 France
 Gabon
 Georgia
 Germany
 Ghana
 Great Britain
 Greece
 Guatemala
 Guinea
 Haiti
 Honduras
 Hong Kong, China
 Hungary
 Iceland
 India
 Indonesia
 Iran
 Iraq
 Ireland
 Israel
 Italy
 Japan
 Kazakhstan
 Kenya
 Kiribati
 Kosovo
 Kuwait
 Kyrgyzstan
 Laos
 Latvia
 Lebanon
 Libya
 Liechtenstein
 Lithuania
 Luxembourg
 Macau
 Macedonia
 Malawi
 Malaysia
 Malta
 Mauritania
 Mauritius
 Mexico
 Moldova
 Monaco
 Montenegro
 Mongolia
 Morocco
 Myanmar
 Namibia
 Nepal
 Netherlands
 New Zealand
 Nicaragua
 Niger
 Nigeria
 Norfolk Island
 North Korea
 Norway
 Pakistan
 Palau
 Panama
 Papua New Guinea
 Paraguay
 Peru
 Philippines
 Poland
 Portugal
 Puerto Rico
 Qatar
 Romania
 Russia
 Rwanda
 Saint Kitts and Nevis
 Samoa
 San Marino
 Saudi Arabia
 Senegal
 Serbia
 Sierra Leone
 Singapore
 Slovakia
 Slovenia
 Somalia
 South Africa
 South Korea
 Spain
 Sri Lanka
 Sudan
 Suriname
 Sweden
 Switzerland
 Tahiti
 Chinese Taipei (Taiwan)
 Tajikistan
 Thailand
 Togo
 Tonga
 Trinidad and Tobago
 Tunisia
 Turkey
 Uganda
 Ukraine
 United States
 Uruguay
 Uzbekistan
 Vanuatu
 Venezuela
 Vietnam
 US Virgin Islands
 Zimbabwe

Rankings

World Archery publishes world rankings for each category of outdoor competitive archery (men / women; recurve / compound; individual / team / mixed team), updated following every official eligible event.

Each archer earns a ranking score for each competition. The ranking scores are calculated through a combination of the ranking factor of the tournament (as determined by the quality of competition, the number of competitors, and how recently the competition took place) and points based on the competitor's final position in the competition. The archer's four highest ranking scores are then combined to form their 'Added Ranking Score', which forms the basis of the ranking list.

Current rankings

Current number one ranked archers
Updated 30 September 2021

Summary Championships

The following table shows the venue of all World Championships on the current World Archery programme:

Events

Summer Olympics

Archery was first competed at the Summer Olympic Games in 1900 and, after a long hiatus from 1924, became a regular event from 1972. Team events were added in 1988. Recurve archery is currently the only discipline competed at the Olympics.

Archery is also competed at the Summer Paralympics (recurve and compound disciplines), the Youth Olympic Games (recurve only), and the World Games (Field archery only).

World Cup

The Archery World Cup is an annual event that was inaugurated in 2006. It is designed to present archery in 'spectacular' locations.

The format consists of 4 rounds competed across the world during a calendar year. The best individual and mixed team performers across these rounds are then invited to compete in the World Cup Final at the end of the year.

An indoor World Cup, competed in 3 rounds with a final during the winter season, was inaugurated in the 2010–11 season.

World Championships

 World Target Championships
 World Outdoor Archery Championships
 World Indoor Archery Championships
 World Field Archery Championships
 World 3D Archery Championships
 World Ski Archery Championships
 World Para Archery Championships
 World Youth Archery Championships
 World University Archery Championships
FITA began holding Target World Championships in 1931. They were held every year until 1959, when the Championships became biennial events. 1959 was also the first year that FITA held the World Field Championship.

Presently, there are five principal formats of the World Archery Championships: Outdoor, Indoor, Youth, Para-Archery, and Field. Each is held every two years on different rotations. World Championships are also held every two years in 3D archery and University sport. In 2007, a ski archery World Championships was held in Moscow; this is yet to be repeated and is not included in the current rotation.

Other

Archery is an optional sport at the Universiade and the Commonwealth Games.

Current champions

The following archers are the current champions of the major World Archery Federation events:

Presidents

See also 
 List of shooting sports organizations

References

External links
 Official website
 History of FITA 1931-1961 by Robert Rhode
 Archery Champions by Robert Rhode

 
Archery organizations
Arc
Arch
Sports organizations established in 1931